Doubles is a 2011 Malayalam-language action comedy drama film directed by debutant Sohan Seenulal and written by the Sachi-Sethu duo. It stars Mammootty, Nadia Moidu and Taapsee Pannu, with Saiju Kurup, Anoop Chandran, Bijukuttan, Suraj Venjaramoodu, Anandaraj, Suresh and Avinash in other roles. It also features Roma and Rima Kallingal in cameo roles, and music by James Vasanthan. The film released coinciding with the festival of Vishu on 14 April 2011. Doubles is a story of two siblings who rescue victims of road accidents. Mammootty plays the role of Giri and Nadia his twin sister Gowri.

Synopsis
The film tells the story of fraternal twins Giri and Gowri, who lost their parents in an accident early in life. They grew up together in an orphanage, inseparable. When they grew rich, they set up an accident rescue unit in Puducherry in memories of their parents. They have even learned mountaineering to carry out rescue operations. Their team consists of Sameer, Susheelan, Bijukuttan, and a good for nothing ambulance-chasing lawyer named Lawrence. Giri and Gowri are absolutely inseparable, and for the same reason have remained unmarried as well. One day they rescue a girl named Saira Banu from an accident, but then on, with Saira's identity remaining a mystery. Saira remains behind a purdah for a long time, and the antics that the men around her come up with to take a look at her face forms the comedy element of the film. Giri finds that Saira's accident was fabricated by Gowri's fiancé Mishal. Everything around their happy life takes a sudden change from that point.

Cast

 Mammootty as Giri
 Nadia Moidu as Gowri (voiceover by Devi S.)
 Taapsee Pannu as Saira Banu (voiceover by Meera Nandan)
 Suresh as Mishal Pierre
 Saiju Kurup as Sameer
 Anoop Chandran as Susheelan
 Bijukuttan
 Suraj Venjaramoodu as Adv. Lawrence
 Anandaraj as Patan
 Avinash as Louie
 Y. G. Mahendra as Pierre Sayippu
 Salim Kumar as SI P.P Jolly/Mayyazhi
 Narayanan Kutty as Mukundan
 Geetha Vijayan as Giri and Gowri's mother
 Tejus Ameer as Young Giri
 Raihana Mariyam as Young Gowri
 Anita Alex as Gowri's daughter
 Joju George
 Abu Salim
 Jaya Menon
 Kiran Rathod (cameo)
 Roma (cameo)
 Rima Kallingal (cameo)
 Sruthi Ramakrishnan as Dr. Beena (cameo)

Production
Doubles is the directorial debut of Sohan Seenulal. Seenulal had previously worked as an assistant director for many films including three starring Mammootty. It was during the filming of Mayavi (2007) that Seenulal approached Mammootty with the intention of making a film with him in the lead. Nadia Moidu, who was one of the most adored actresses of Malayalam cinema of all time, makes her comeback in Malayalam with this film. Mammootty and Nadia had earlier worked in Shyama (1986) and Poovinu Puthiya Poonthennal (1986). Both the actors will be working together again after over two decades. Originally planned to begin on 15 November 2010,

Music
The soundtrack was composed by James Vasanthan.
"Aaru Nee Arike" – Hariharan
"Kiliyamma Koodu Koottum" – Deepa Miriam, Karthik
"Chaattamazhayo" –  Sangeethaa-Sangeetha Sajith
"Vedaanthame Doore" – Benny Dayal

Release
The film released coinciding with the festival of Vishu on 14 April 2011.

Reception
Paresh C. Pallicha of Rediff.com rated the movie two in a scale of five and stated, "On the whole, Doubles has fallen to the level of a never-ending tacky television serial." Keerthi Ramachandran of Deccan Chronicle stated, "Doubles was more like a plot done in impromptu. With a very thin storyline of two siblings running an accident rescue service in Puducherry after their parents bled to death in a road accident, goes on to have a totally unrelated story behind." She also criticized the technical aspects of the film. Veeyen of Nowrunning.com rated the film 1.5 in a scale of five and said, "Doubles offers a desultory tour through streets that you have been through several times before. It's a dreary drama that has been dipped in the mundane. So, the disappointments are double, the predictability double and the corniness even more than double." The reviewer of Sify.com stated, "This one has been a disappointment, nothing less."

Box office
The film was commercial failure in Kerala box office but it's Tamil version Puduvai Managaram was commercial success in Tamil Nadu box office and it ran over 50 days in theatres.

References

External links

Further reading
 

2010s Malayalam-language films
Indian drama films
Films shot in Puducherry
Films shot in Goa
Twins in Indian films
2011 drama films
2011 films